Chedoke Twin Pad Arena is a city-owned recreation complex in Hamilton, Ontario, Canada. It includes two ice rinks, as well as meeting rooms. It is also the home of the Chedoke Minor Hockey League, the Hamilton Huskies Associations, and Hamilton Sledge Hockey.

External links
Chedoke Twin Pad Arena (www.myhamilton.ca)
Map to Twin Pad Arena (www.ArenaMaps.com)
Chedoke Minor Hockey League
Hamilton Reps Associations
Hamilton Sledge Hockey

Indoor arenas in Ontario
Indoor ice hockey venues in Ontario
Sports venues in Hamilton, Ontario